Diana West (born November 8, 1961) is a former nationally syndicated conservative American columnist and author. Until 2014, she wrote a weekly column which frequently dealt with controversial subjects such as Islam and was syndicated by Universal Uclick and appeared in about 120 newspapers and news sites. She is the author of the books The Death of the Grown Up: How America's Arrested Development Is Bringing Down Western Civilization (St. Martin's Press, 2007) and American Betrayal: The Secret Assault on Our Nation's Character (St. Martin's Press, 2013).

West has been a columnist for Scripps Howard News Service and United Media. As a former CNN contributor, West frequently appeared on CNN's Lou Dobbs show.  She is a graduate of Yale University. She has been co-vice president of the International Free Press Society, considered a key part of the counter-jihad movement, along with her webpage.

American Betrayal
On May 28, 2013, St. Martin's Press published West's second book, American Betrayal: The Secret Assault on Our Nation's Character. West argues that after the fall of the Soviet Union, historians failed to sufficiently "adjust the historical record" to account for newly available Soviet files and archives. West writes on the extent of Soviet influence during the Roosevelt and Truman Presidencies. She argues that infiltration of the American government by Stalinist agents and fellow-travelers had significantly altered Allied policies in favor of the Soviet Union during the Second World War. Frank J. Gaffney Jr. finds that West "painstakingly documents how America's government, media, academia, political and policy elites actively helped obscure the true nature of the Soviet Union." West contends that there is a parallel with the failure to face the dangers of communism in the 1930s and the failure to face the threat of Islamic extremism today.

Frank T. Csongos argues that West is right "up to a point." He notes that West rejects the standard narrative that Franklin Roosevelt, like George W. Bush, took drastic steps to "save capitalism." Unlike West, he believes that Roosevelt was merely naive when trusting Stalin.

A Kirkus review finds that she has a number of valid points but her additional doubtful speculations go too far. It notes that:  “Not until the 1990s, with access to the Venona files and Soviet archives, have historians wholly appreciated the scope of Russian spying in this country from the time FDR formally recognized the Soviet Union in 1933. West matches these new revelations to previously known facts and wonders why we’ve neglected to fully adjust the historical record.”  It ends with the warning: "A frustrating mixture of incontrovertible facts and dubious speculation. Proceed with caution."

Former Canadian newspaper publisher and FDR biographer Conrad Black published a critique of American Betrayal in the conservative journal National Review in late 2013, to which West responded and Black then rejoined.  Like Radosh et al., Black believes West grossly exaggerates Soviet influence in the Roosevelt Administration, whose policies were driven by the extreme social and economic crisis America was going through during the Depression.  Moreover, like Radosh, Black believes the alliance with the Soviet Union in the Second World War, while driven by realpolitik, was a dire necessity to prevent the victory of Nazi Germany which had already conquered France and was threatening Britain, and finds West's dismissal of the D-Day invasion of Normandy as somehow the result of Soviet subterfuge to shift the strategic thrust from the campaign in Italy to be an absurd and amateurish contention that ignores the realities of logistics and terrain. All these authors also point out that for the first two years of World War 2 during the period of the Stalin-Hitler Pact, widely considered odious among liberals, the policy of the FDR administration was at loggerheads with that of the Soviets in aiding Britain through Lend-Lease and point out the irony that at that time communists allied with isolationists and the America First movement, whose legacy West extols.

Jonathan Chait, a liberal pundit and writer for New York magazine, says that West's "thesis that American foreign policy under presidents Roosevelt, Truman, and Eisenhower was secretly controlled by the Soviet Union" has found supporters at the Heritage Foundation and the American Spectator.

Andrew C. McCarthy also came to West's defense in a review-essay in The New Criterion, where he writes West relies on M. Stanton Evans book that comes to the defense of Senator Joseph McCarthy and cites the "groundbreaking scholarship of John Earl Haynes and Harvey Klehr" to back up Evans' claims.

West responded to Haynes and Klehr, writing: "Notice they do not claim American Betrayal makes serious historical errors. According to [Haynes and Klehr], American Betrayal makes serious interpretative errors. If you are wondering who sets the standard of interpretation, who deems what is in alignment or out, what is "incorrect" or correct, so am I." As noted above, however, Haynes and Klehr do claim West made serious historical errors, the most egregious being that Harry Hopkins was the soviet spy "source 19" named in the Venona transcripts, who they believe the evidence shows was actually State Department official Laurence Duggan.

Bibliography
The Death of the Grownup: How America's Arrested Development Is Bringing Down Western Civilization / Diana West (St. Martin's Griffin, 2007) 

American Betrayal: The Secret Assault on Our Nation's Character / Diana West (St. Martin's Press, 2013) 
The Rebuttal: Defending 'American Betrayal' from the Book-Burners /Diana West (Bravura Books, 2013) 
The Red Thread: A Search for Ideological Drivers Inside the Anti-Trump Conspiracy / Diana West, (Center for Security Policy Press, 2019),

References

External links

Personal website
Feature Bank Diana West Profile
Biography and links to syndicated columns at Townhall.com

C-SPAN Q&A interview with West, January 22, 2012

American columnists
American critics of Islam
Counter-jihad activists
Living people
Yale College alumni
1961 births
People from Hollywood, Los Angeles
Writers from California
Espionage in the United States
American women columnists
21st-century American women